Vampalus is a genus of cetotheriid mysticete from Miocene (Tortonian) marine deposits in the Russian Caucasus. The type species, V. sayasanicus, is based on PIN 5341/1, a complete skeleton. The cetotheriid Eucetotherium helmersonii was mistakenly assigned to Vampalus by Tarasenko and Lopatin, who were unaware that Kellogg (1931) fixed "Cetotherium" helmersonii as the Eucetotherium type species.

References 

Baleen whales
Miocene cetaceans
Prehistoric cetacean genera
Fossil taxa described in 2012
Miocene mammals of Europe